Pablo Daniel Ceppelini Gatto (born 11 September 1991, in Montevideo) is a Uruguayan footballer who plays for Cuiabá as a midfielder.

Club career
He played for Bella Vista and helped them win promotion from the Segunda División Profesional, playing in both legs of their promotion play-off victory over Miramar Misiones. He subsequently played for Bella Vista in the 2010–11 Uruguayan Primera División season, before transferring to Peñarol at the halfway stage of the season.

However, Ceppelini did not actually play a game for Peñarol, and was transferred on to Italian side Cagliari on 31 January 2011 for a fee of €2,350,000, with Penarol receiving 10% of this fee. Ceppelini made three Serie A appearances in his first part-season in Italy.

In 2011–12 he made five league appearances for Cagliari.

On 2 September 2013, Ceppelini joined Slovenian team Maribor, on loan from Cagliari.

In the summer 2014 transfer window he moved from Cagliari to Universitatea Cluj.

He did not return to Cluj in 2015–16, buying out his contract to become a free agent, and was set to play for Montevideo Wanderers from Uruguay.

After playing for Wanderers in 2015/16 he moved to Boston River for the 2016 season. He moved to Danubio for 2018.

International career

He played in all three of Uruguay's matches in the 2011 FIFA U-20 World Cup tournament that was held in Colombia.

References

External links

1991 births
Living people
Footballers from Montevideo
Uruguayan people of Italian descent
Uruguayan footballers
Uruguay under-20 international footballers
Association football midfielders
C.A. Bella Vista players
F.C. Lumezzane V.G.Z. A.S.D. players
Cagliari Calcio players
NK Maribor players
FC Universitatea Cluj players
Montevideo Wanderers F.C. players
Boston River players
Danubio F.C. players
Atlético Nacional footballers
Cruz Azul footballers
Peñarol players
Cuiabá Esporte Clube players
Uruguayan Primera División players
Slovenian PrvaLiga players
Serie A players
Serie C players
Liga I players
Categoría Primera A players
Liga MX players
Campeonato Brasileiro Série A players
Uruguayan expatriate footballers
Uruguayan expatriate sportspeople in Italy
Uruguayan expatriate sportspeople in Slovenia
Uruguayan expatriate sportspeople in Romania
Uruguayan expatriate sportspeople in Colombia
Uruguayan expatriate sportspeople in Mexico
Uruguayan expatriate sportspeople in Brazil
Expatriate footballers in Italy
Expatriate footballers in Slovenia
Expatriate footballers in Romania
Expatriate footballers in Colombia
Expatriate footballers in Mexico
Expatriate footballers in Brazil